Mark Blagrove is a British research psychologist who specializes in the study of sleep and  dreams.

He is a professor of psychology at Swansea University in Wales, and is Director of the Swansea University Sleep Laboratory.

Education 
From 1979 to 1982, Blagrove studied for an MA in Natural Sciences at Fitzwilliam College, Cambridge University in England. He then went on to obtain a PhD in 1989 at Brunel University London, where he published a doctoral thesis titled "The narrative of dream reports". In 2019-2020, Blagrove gained a Graduate Certificate in Humanistic and Psychodynamic Counselling from Goldsmiths, University of London.

Career 
From 1989 to 1991, Blagrove was a research fellow at Loughborough University in the School of Sport, Exercise and Health Sciences.

Since 1991, Blagrove has worked at Swansea University in Wales, initially as a lecturer, then senior lecturer, reader, and finally professor of psychology. He specializes in the study of "the relationship between sleep and cognition, including effects of sleep loss, memory consolidation functions of sleep, causes and possible functions of dreaming, nightmares, and lucid dreams."

Blagrove is Director of the Swansea University Sleep Laboratory, which "investigates sleep, dreaming, and what happens when people are deprived of sleep."

He is a past President of the International Association for the Study of Dreams, a Fellow of the British Psychological Society, and a Consulting Editor for the journal Dreaming, published by the American Psychological Association on behalf of the International Association for the Study of Dreams.

Selected research

Suggestibility
An early study by Blagrove in 1996 showed that sleep deprivation causes a trend for greater suggestibility during interrogation. That is, they "have reduced cognitive ability or motivation to discriminate and detect discrepancies between original and misleading information."

Sensory processing sensitivity 
In humans high Sensory Processing Sensitivity refers to greater responsivity to stimuli, slower, deeper processing, aesthetic sensitivity, and low threshold for sensory discomfort. It is measured by the Highly Sensitive Person Scale. Blagrove and colleagues have shown that score on the HSPS correlates significantly with ability to detect spoken words that are present but degraded in auditory stimuli. Sensory Processing Sensitivity has been shown by Blagrove and colleagues to be a predisposing factor for nightmares.

Dream-lag
One of Blagrove's series of findings concerns the "dream-lag effect". A study in 2011 "investigates evidence, from dream reports, for memory consolidation during sleep". A second study in 2015 shows that "incorporation of details from waking life events into Rapid Eye Movement (REM) sleep dreams has been found to be highest on the night after, and then 5–7 nights after events (termed, respectively, the day-residue and dream-lag effects).". A third study into the "dream-lag effect" in 2019 was "the first to categorize types of waking life experiences and compare their incorporation into dreams across multiple successive nights." The chosen categories were: major daily activities (such as going to work or university, meals and shopping); personally significant events (such as emotional events); and major concerns (such as money problems or exam stress), and participants were asked to maintain diary entries both for these categories of waking experience, accompanying emotion and its intensity, and to record their dreams. The study found that "personally significant events persist, but not major daily activities or concerns."

Dreaming, metaphor, insight, and memory consolidation
A study by Blagrove in 2013 looks into largely-anecdotal claims that "dreams can be a source of personal insight", and finds tangential support for the "facilitative effect of sleep on cognitive insight" and of REM sleep on emotional memory consolidation, and for the emergence of insight from the metaphorical representations of waking life found in dreams.

Another study in 2015 also showed theoretical support for such claims, finding that rapid eye movement (REM) sleep plays a role in the "consolidation of emotional memories and the creative formation of connections between new and older memories."

A third study in 2020, assessing Exploration-Insight scores (a measure of Gains in Dream Interpretation proposed in 1996 by Clara Hill in Working with Dreams in Psychotherapy) following discussion of REM dreams, non-REM dreams, and daydreams, suggests that "insight might be produced by embodied and metaphorical thinking in dreams."

DreamsID 
DreamsID (short for "Dreams Illustrated and Discussed" or "Dreams Interpreted and Drawn") is a practical, collaborative project between artist Dr. Julia Lockheart and Mark Blagrove. They hold 60 – 90 minute sessions with the dream subject and an invited audience, and while the subject shares their dream, with Blagrove helping to facilitate and visualize the dream narrative, Lockheart draws and paints the dream, in real-time, on a torn-out page from Sigmund Freud's book, The Interpretation of Dreams, to create "a tapestry of elements, plot, metaphoric imagery, and Freud's words." This follows a Dadaist and Surrealist performance aesthetic (Lockheart et al., 2021). Then, later in the session, the audience is invited to join in the discussion, referencing the dream to waking life, according to the method devised by psychiatrist Montague Ullman.

In the course of the sessions, Lockheart and Blagrove began to notice that the sharing of the dreams and the discussions were having an effect not only on them but on some of the audience, and that the sessions were invoking empathy toward the subjects sharing their dreams. As a result of this, the collaborators went on to co-author an important scientific paper, "Testing the Empathy Theory of Dreaming: The Relationships Between Dream Sharing and Trait and State Empathy", which was later published in Frontiers in Psychology.

As well as being an artist, Julia Lockheart is an Associate Lecturer at Goldsmiths, University of London, and a Senior Lecturer at Swansea College of Art, University of Wales Trinity Saint David. Her own research includes "languaging within metadesign and the relationship between writing and collaboration in arts education."

In April 2019, the BBC World Service Television programme CrowdScience broadcast a segment in which Lockheart is shown painting as a candidate shares her dream.

In October 2020 and January 2021, Blagrove and Lockheart held online events to commemorate the 120th anniversaries of Sigmund Freud's patient Dora telling two dreams to Freud. The first dream was of being rescued from a burning house by her father, the second was of travelling to her father's funeral. The aim of the events was to discuss with expert panel and worldwide audience how Dora’s two dreams could be related to her distressing family circumstances The two dreams were painted by Lockheart during the discussions.

Publications

Books
   (Hardcover),  (Paperback)

Articles in journals 
Blagrove has authored or co-authored over 50 academic and research papers, published in peer reviewed scientific journals, during his career:

 

 

 

  (Provisionally accepted).

Other articles

See also 
 Dream interpretation

References

External links 
 Profile at Swansea University
 Mark Blagrove at ResearchGate
 Mark Blagrove at Google Scholar
 Swansea University Sleep Lab
 DreamsID science art collaboration

Living people
Alumni of Fitzwilliam College, Cambridge
Alumni of Brunel University London
English psychologists
Sleep researchers
Oneirologists
Academics of Swansea University
Fellows of the British Psychological Society
Date of birth missing (living people)
Place of birth missing (living people)
Year of birth missing (living people)